The Diocese of Paterson is a Latin Church ecclesiastical territory or diocese of the Catholic Church in the United States that encompasses Passaic, Morris, and Sussex counties in northern New Jersey.  Most of this territory lies to the west of the episcopal see in Paterson.  , there were 166 active diocesan priests, 96 retired priests, 124 religious priests, 136 permanent deacons, 19 retired permanent deacons, 178 male religious and 677 female religious to serve 426,000 Catholics out of a total population of 1,143,500, ranking it 44th in Catholic population among dioceses in the United States. The patrons of the diocese are St. Patrick and St. John the Baptist, and its proper feasts are the Feast of St. Patrick (17 March), the Nativity of John the Baptist (24 June), the anniversary of the dedication of the cathedral church (30 June). The diocese is a suffragan diocese in the ecclesiastical province of the metropolitan Archdiocese of Newark, and is part of Region III of the United States Conference of Catholic Bishops.

History
The diocese was established by Pope Pius XI on December 9, 1937, the same day that the dioceses of Camden, New Jersey and Owensboro, Kentucky were established. The new Diocese of Paterson was created by taking territory formerly part of the (then) Diocese of Newark. Bishop Thomas J. Walsh, the Bishop of Newark, was made the archbishop of a newly elevated Archdiocese of Newark the next day, December 10, 1937.

One week later, Walsh's auxiliary bishop, Thomas H. McLaughlin, was appointed as the first Bishop of Paterson, and the former parish church of St. John the Baptist in Paterson was established as the diocesan cathedral. In 1938, Bishop McLaughlin established Associated Catholic Charities in the Diocese of Paterson. 

Following the death of Bishop Thomas H. McLaughlin, Thomas Aloysius Boland, rector of Immaculate Conception Seminary, was named the second Bishop of Paterson on June 21, 1947. He served as bishop for five years, before being appointed Archbishop of Newark in 1952.

Boland was succeeded by James A. McNulty who was bishop for ten years before being named Bishop of Buffalo in 1963. During his tenure, he established thirteen new parishes.

Sexual abuse
On February 13, 2019, all of the Catholic dioceses based in New Jersey released the names of clergy who had been credibly accused of sexually abusing children since 1940. Of the 188 listed, 28 were based in the Diocese of Paterson. Newark archbishop, Cardinal Joseph Tobin, who leads the ecclesiastical province where the Diocese of Paterson is based, stated that the names were previously reported to law enforcement agencies. One priest was listed under both the Archdiocese of Newark and the Diocese of Paterson. By 2020, the names of 40 accused clergy listed were made public. 

On February 9, 2020, it was reported that all five Catholic dioceses across the state of New Jersey, which includes the Diocese of Paterson, had paid over $11 million compensate 105 claims of sex abuse committed by Catholic clergy. Of these 105 claims, 98 were compensated through settlements.

In 2003, James Hanley was laicized having admitted to the sexually abuse of a number of children while serving in the Diocese.  In 2004, the Diocese of Paterson settled lawsuits from 21 of Hanley's victims for approximately $5 million. In December 2019, more accusers of Hanley filed new lawsuits against the Diocese of Paterson. Hanley died in April 2020.

On August 10, 2020, former Bishop of Paterson Frank Rodimer's decision to approve of the Vatican naming Archdiocese of Newark Auxiliary Bishop Arthur Serratelli as his successor came under criticism, due to revelations that he had learned about sex abuse allegations facing Serratelli's former Newark superior, ArchBishop Theodore McCarrick. It was also revealed that a Diocese of Paterson official had informed Rodimer at the time of allegations that McCarrick had sexually abuses boys at his beach house and that Rodimer then claimed to the official that he would contact the Vatican's U.S. representatives. On December 1, 2020, it was revealed that the Archdiocese of Newark was among more than 230 sex abuse lawsuits filed within a period of one year against New Jersey Catholic Dioceses.

Bishops

Bishops of Paterson
 Thomas Henry McLaughlin (1937–1947)
 Thomas Aloysius Boland (1947–1952), appointed Archbishop of Newark
 James A. McNulty (1953–1963), appointed Bishop of Buffalo
 James Johnston Navagh (1963–1965)
 Lawrence B. Casey (1966–1977)
 Frank Joseph Rodimer (1978–2004)
 Arthur J. Serratelli (2004–2020)
 Kevin J. Sweeney (2020–present)

Leadership and deaneries

Leadership
 Diocesan bishop: The Most Reverend Kevin J. Sweeney
 Vicar general and Moderator of the Curia:
 Msgr. James T. Mahoney
 The Rev. Michael Parisi
 Judicial vicars:
Msgr. Edward J. Kurtyka, P.A., judicial vicar
Msgr. Joseph Anginoli, adjutant judicial vicar
Episcopal vicars:
The Rev. Stanley Barron, Vicar for Education
The Rev. Hernan Arias, Vicar for Pastoral Administration
The Rev. Paul Manning, Vicar for Evangelization
 Chancellor and Delegate for Religious: Sr. Joan Healy, S.C.C. 
 Vice chancellor and priest-secretary to the bishop: The Rev. Stephen Prisk
 Vice Chancellor for Urban Ministry and Planning: Sr. Catherine McDonnell, O.P.

Deaneries
The 109 parishes of the diocese are split organizationally into twelve deaneries spanning the three counties:

City of Paterson

 Blessed Sacrament
 Our Lady of Lourdes
 Our Lady of Pompei
 Our Lady of Victories
 St. Agnes
 St. Anthony of Padua
 St. Bonaventure
 St. Gerard Majella
 St. John the Baptist Cathedral (parish website)
 St. Joseph
 St. Mary Help of Christians
 St. Michael the Archangel
 St. Stephen
 St. Therese

City of Passaic

 Holy Rosary
 Holy Trinity
 Our Lady of Fatima
 Our Lady of Mt. Carmel
 St. Anthony of Padua
 St. Joseph
 St. Mary's Assumption
 St. Nicholas
 St. Stephen

City of Clifton

 St. Andrew the Apostle
 St. Brendan-St. George
 St. Clare
 SS. Cyril & Methodius
 St. John Kanty
 St. Philip the Apostle
 Sacred Heart
 St. Paul

Mid-Passaic County

 Annunciation of the Blessed Virgin Mary (Wayne)
 Holy Cross (Wayne)
 Immaculate Heart of Mary (Wayne)
 Our Lady of Consolation (Wayne)
 Our Lady of the Holy Angels (Little Falls)
 Our Lady of the Valley (Wayne)
 St. Anthony (Hawthorne)
 St. James of the Marches (Totowa)
 St. Paul (Prospect Park)

Northern Passaic County

 Our Lady Queen of Peace (Hewitt)
 St. Anthony (Butler)
 St. Catherine of Bologna (Ringwood)
 St. Francis of Assisi (Haskell)
 St. Joseph (West Milford)
 St. Mary (Pompton Lakes)

Eastern Morris County

 Notre Dame of Mt. Carmel (Cedar Knolls)
 Our Lady of Mercy (Whippany)
 St. Ann (Parsippany)
 St. Catherine of Siena (Mountain Lakes)
 St. Christopher (Parsippany)
 St. Peter the Apostle (Parsippany)
 St. Rose of Lima (East Hanover)
 St. Virgil (Morris Plains)

Northeastern Morris County

 Holy Spirit (Pequannock)
 Our Lady of Good Counsel (Pompton Plains)
 Our Lady of the Magnificat (Kinnelon)
 Our Lady of Mt. Carmel (Boonton)
 SS. Cyril & Methodius (Boonton)
 St. Joseph (Lincoln Park)
 St. Pius X (Montville)

N.B. Our Lady of Fatima Traditional Latin Mass Chapel, located in Pequannock, is not considered a parish of the Diocese of Paterson. Instead, it is a chapel of ease administered by the Priestly Fraternity of St. Peter.

Northern Morris County

 Our Lady of the Holy Rosary (Dover)
 Sacred Heart (Dover)
 Sacred Heart of Jesus (Rockaway)
 St. Bernard (Wharton)
 St. Cecilia (Rockaway)
 St. Clement Pope and Martyr (Rockaway Township)
 St. Mary (Denville)
 St. Mary (Dover)
 St. Simon the Apostle (Green Pond)

Southeastern Morris County 

 Christ the King (New Vernon)
 Corpus Christi (Chatham Township)
 Holy Family (Florham Park)
 St. Patrick (Chatham)
 St. Thomas More (Convent Station)
 St. Vincent Martyr (Madison)
 St. Vincent de Paul (Stirling)

Southwestern Morris County 

 Assumption of the Blessed Virgin Mary (Morristown)
 Our Lady of the Mountain (Schooleys Mountain)
 Resurrection (Randolph)
 St. Elizabeth Ann Seton (Flanders)
 St. Joseph (Mendham)
 St. Lawrence the Martyr (Chester)
 St. Luke (Long Valley)
 St. Margaret of Scotland (Morristown)
 St. Mark the Evangelist (Long Valley)
 St. Matthew the Apostle (Randolph)

Western Morris County

 Our Lady of the Lake (Mount Arlington)
 Our Lady Star of the Sea (Lake Hopatcong [Jefferson Township])
 St. Jude (Budd Lake)
 St. Jude (Hopatcong)
 St. Michael (Netcong)
 St. Therese (Succasunna)
 St. Thomas the Apostle (Oak Ridge)

Sussex County

 St. Kateri Tekakwitha (Sparta)
 Good Shepherd (Andover)
 Immaculate Conception (Franklin)
 Our Lady of Fatima (Highland Lakes)
 Our Lady of the Lake Church (Sparta)
 Our Lady of Mount Carmel (Swartswood [Newton])
 Our Lady Queen of Peace (Branchville)
 St. Francis de Sales (McAfee)
 St. James the Greater (Montague) 
 St. John Vianney (Stockholm)
 St. Joseph (Newton)
 St. Jude the Apostle (Hamburg)
 St. Monica (Sussex)
 St. Thomas of Aquin (Ogdensburg)
 St. Thomas the Apostle (Sandyston)

Institutions in the diocese

Educational institutions

 Tertiary education
 Assumption College for Sisters, Mendham (operated by the Sisters of Christian Charity)
 Saint Elizabeth University (formerly College of Saint Elizabeth), Convent Station (operated by the Sisters of Charity of Saint Elizabeth)

Diocesan high schools
 DePaul Catholic High School, Wayne
 Morris Catholic High School, Denville
 Pope John XXIII Regional High School, Sparta

Other Catholic high schools
 Academy of Saint Elizabeth, Convent Station (operated by the Sisters of Charity of Saint Elizabeth)
 Delbarton School, Morristown (operated by the Benedictine monks of Saint Mary's Abbey)
 Mary Help of Christians Academy, North Haledon (operated by the Salesian Sisters)
 Villa Walsh Academy, Morristown (operated by the Religious Teachers Filippini)

Former diocesan high schools
 Pope Pius XII High School, Passaic (closed at the end of the 1982-1983 academic year)
 Neumann Preparatory School, Wayne (closed at the end of the 1989-1990 academic year)
 Paul VI Regional High School, Clifton (closed at the end of the 1989-1990 academic year)
 Paterson Catholic High School, Paterson (closed at the end of the 2009-2010 academic year)

Catholic hospitals
 Saint Clare's Health System (part of Catholic Health Initiatives)
St. Clare's Hospital/Boonton (formerly Riverside Hospital)
St. Clare's Hospital/Denville
St. Clare's Hospital/Dover (formerly Dover General Hospital)
St. Clare's Hospital/Sussex (formerly Wallkill Valley Hospital)
 St. Joseph's Healthcare System (operated by the Sisters of Charity of Saint Elizabeth):
St. Joseph's Regional Medical Center, Paterson
St. Joseph's Children's Hospital, Paterson
St. Joseph's Wayne Hospital (formerly Wayne General Hospital)
 St. Mary's Hospital, Passaic (operated by the Sisters of Charity of Saint Elizabeth)

Geography
Because of its location in Passaic, Morris and Sussex Counties, the Diocese of Paterson contains a wide spectrum of natural landmarks. The Diocese contains the highest portion of the state of New Jersey in the Skylands Region of Sussex County, as well as the largest lake in the state (Lake Hopatcong), the Great Falls of Paterson and the Great Swamp in Morris County. As for man-made landmarks, the Diocese of Paterson contains one of the parishes claiming to be the oldest Catholic parish in the state, namely Saint Joseph Parish in West Milford.

Geographically, the Diocese of Paterson is bordered by four other dioceses: The Archdiocese of Newark (east), the Diocese of Metuchen (south), the Diocese of Scranton, Pennsylvania (west) and the Archdiocese of New York (north).

Further reading
 Kupke, Raymond J.;Living Stones: A History of the Church in the Diocese of Paterson, Clifton. 1987
 Shriner, Charles A., ''History of the Catholic Church in Paterson, N.J.

See also
List of the Catholic cathedrals of the United States
List of the Catholic dioceses of the United States
Plenary Councils of Baltimore
Roman Catholicism in the United States
Catholicism and American politics
History of Roman Catholicism in the United States

References

External links
Official website
New Jersey Provincial Directory

 
Paterson, New Jersey
Christian organizations established in 1937
Paterson
Paterson
1937 establishments in New Jersey